Joséphine Nkou (born 18 September 1997) is a Congolese/French handball player for Paris 92 and the Congolese national team.

She participated at the 2021 World Women's Handball Championship in Spain.

References

1997 births
Living people
Congolese female handball players